() was a special title and rank that existed between the years of 1925 and 1945 for the commander of the  (SS). Reichsführer-SS was a title from 1925 to 1933, and from 1934 to 1945 it was the highest rank of the SS. The longest-serving and most noteworthy office holder was Heinrich Himmler.

Definition
 was both a title and a rank. Yet, the title was retroactively applied to him in later years. This set the precedent for the commander of the SS to be called .

On 20 July 1934, as part of the purge of the SA, the SS was made an independent branch of the Nazi Party, responsible only to Hitler. From that point on, the title of  became an actual rank, and in fact the highest rank of the SS. As Himmler's position and authority grew in Nazi Germany, so did his rank in a "de facto" sense. Further, there was never more than one  at any one time, with Himmler holding the position as his personal title from 1929 (becoming his actual rank in 1934) until April 1945.

Duties

He was responsible for all internal security within Nazi Germany. He was overseer of the concentration camps, extermination camps (through the Concentration Camps Inspectorate and SS-TV), and the Einsatzgruppen mobile death squads (through the Reich Security Main Office; RSHA). Over time, his influence on both civil and foreign policy became marked, as the Reichsführer reported directly to Hitler and his actions were not tempered by checks and balances. This meant the office holder could implement broad policy, such as the Nazi plan for the Genocide or extermination of the Jews, or order criminal acts such as the Stalag Luft III murders, without impediment.

It is difficult to separate the office from the duties assigned to the individual. As of 20 April 1934, Himmler in his position of  already controlled the SD and the Gestapo. On 17 June 1936 Himmler was named chief of all German police, thereby placing all uniformed police (Orpo) and criminal police (Kripo) in Germany under his control. In the latter role, he was nominally subordinate to the Interior Minister, Wilhelm Frick. It is not clear how much of this power would technically reside in the office of the Reichsführer-SS were those duties to be split up. These questions became moot by the time Himmler became the Interior Minister in 1943.

It is difficult to define precisely the full detailed duties and responsibilities of the  beyond that of leader and senior member of the SS, since, in the words of historian Martin Windrow, "by the outbreak of the (Second World) war it would have been impossible to define exactly the role within the state" of the entire SS itself.

Relationship with the Waffen-SS
The exact position of the rank within the military Waffen-SS  (Armed SS) evolved over many years, ranging from clearly defined to vaguely associated. Although the unit was nominally under Himmler, Sepp Dietrich was the real commander and handled day-to-day administration.

The Waffen-SS eventually grew from three regiments to over 38 divisions and served alongside the German Army, but was never formally part of it. Himmler also held authority to create new Waffen-SS divisions as well as order the formation of various smaller SS combat units. The daily association with the Waffen-SS, however, encompassed primarily inspecting Waffen-SS troops and presenting high-ranking medals to its members.

The  further never exercised direct operational authority over Waffen-SS units until the very end of the war and then only through his capacity as an Army Group commander and not as the head of the SS. Top Waffen-SS commanders, such as Sepp Dietrich, Wilhelm Bittrich, and Matthias Kleinheisterkamp, further held a certain derision for Himmler, describing him as "sly and unmilitary".

To head the Command Staff, Himmler appointed career army officer Kurt Knoblauch, who acted as chief of staff for the units. Prior to the launch of the invasion of the Soviet Union in June 1941, these formations included two motorized SS-Infantry Brigades, two SS-Cavalry Regiments combined into the SS Cavalry Brigade, a bodyguard battalion, flak units and a number of companies of support troops. Units were temporarily placed under army command for operations, but the  could call them back at any time. Despite the name, it was not employed as a unified HQ unit. Often these actions were atrocities and mass murders, targeting Jews, political prisoners and "suspected partisans".

Office holders
In all, five people held the title of  during the twenty years of its existence. Three persons held the position as a title while two held the actual SS rank.

Hanke was appointed SS leader in April 1945, but not informed until early May. He was captured by Czech partisans on 6 May and interned. He was killed on 8 June, while attempting to escape a POW camp. Historians have often speculated that Reinhard Heydrich would have eventually held the rank had Himmler in some way been killed or removed from his position earlier in World War II, and indeed Heydrich was often seen as Himmler's heir apparent by senior SS leaders. However, at a diplomatic function in Italy in 1941, Heydrich was reported as stating that he had no desire to succeed Himmler.

Timeline

Deputy

See also
 Personal Staff Reichsführer-SS
 Freundeskreis der Wirtschaft

Notes

References

Citations

Bibliography

 
 
 
 
 
 
 
 
 
 
 
 
 
 
 

 
SS ranks
Nazi paramilitary ranks
German words and phrases
Heinrich Himmler
Five-star officers of Nazi Germany